Auto Raja is a 1980 Indian Kannada-language romance film directed by Vijay, based on a screenplay by M. D. Sundar. The film was produced by C. Jayaram under the banner of Sapthaswara Movie Makers.  The film stars Shankar Nag and Gayathri in lead roles, while Dwarakeesh, Balakrishna and Leelavathi appear in other supporting roles. The film features original songs composed by the music duo  Rajan–Nagendra. The cinematography of the film was handled by S. V. Srikanth. This film is considered as the one of the best romance films in Kannada cinema and has a cult status. The film was significant in heightening the stardom of Shankar Nag. The film was remade in 1981 in Telugu as Taxi Driver starring Krishnam Raju and in 1982 in Tamil with the same name starring Vijayakanth.

Cast 
 Shankar Nag as Raja
 Gayathri as Rani / Bhavani
 Dwarakish
 Balakrishna as Dr Dinakar, Sudhakar's father
 Thoogudeepa Srinivas as Bhaskar Rao, Bhavani's father
 Sundar Krishna Urs as Sudhakar
 Tiger Prabhakar as Rodrigues
 Leelavathi as Mahalakshmi, Bhavani's mother
 Musuri Krishnamurthy as Mahalinga
 Padma as Sudha, Raja's sister
 K. S. Ashwath
 Papamma as Raja and Sudha's mother
 Prakash Rao as Inspector of Police Station in the intro scene

Soundtrack 
The film's soundtrack was composed by the famed duo Rajan–Nagendra with lyrics penned by Chi. Udayashankar.

Legacy
Shankar Nag, who acted in the role of Raja, the humble auto driver, is credited with bringing a certain dignity to the profession of auto rickshaw drivers. Four decades after the movie release too, Shankar Nag's photo adorns auto rickshaws across Karnataka.

References

External links 
 

1980 films
1980s Kannada-language films
Films scored by Rajan–Nagendra
Films set in Bangalore
Kannada films remade in other languages
Films directed by Vijay (director)